Biele may refer to the following places:
Biele, Kuyavian-Pomeranian Voivodeship (north-central Poland)
Biele, Masovian Voivodeship (east-central Poland)
Biele, Podlaskie Voivodeship (north-east Poland)
Biele, Gmina Sompolno in Greater Poland Voivodeship (west-central Poland)
Biele, Gmina Ślesin in Greater Poland Voivodeship (west-central Poland)